Estadio Empleados del Comercio is a sports stadium in Treinta y Tres, Uruguay.  It is currently used mostly for football matches.  The stadium holds 6,000 people. It is the home stadium of the local team.

References

Buildings and structures in Treinta y Tres Department
Empleados
Sport in Treinta y Tres Department